Richard Lockwood may refer to:
 Richard Lockwood (rugby) (1867–1915), English rugby union and rugby league player
 Richard Lockwood (politician), Tory MP for Hindon (1713)?, City of London (1727–1734), Worcester (1734–1740)
 Richard Lockwood (musician), musician for Tully (1968–72), and Tamam Shud (1971–72)